Jennifer Lynn Lahmers (born February 19, 1984) is an American television news reporter, news anchor and model. She is a correspondent on Extra, a syndicated television newsmagazine reporting entertainment news.  Before joining Extra, Lahmers co-anchored Good Day Wake Up on Fox 5 NY WNYW in New York City and was a reporter and weekend anchor at several local television stations.

Early life

Lahmers was born in Tuscarawas County, Ohio, to parents William and Cathy.  Lahmers has described herself as very shy as a child and young adult.  Nonetheless, from a very early age she focused her interests on a career in television journalism. She attended Dover High School, graduating in 2002. In 2006, she graduated from the E.W. Scripps School of Journalism at Ohio University.

Career

Lahmers' first job in journalism after graduation was as a reporter at WBBJ-TV in Jackson, Tennessee.  She also anchored the weekend news at the station. While at WBBJ, Lahmers worked without writers or crew, writing and even shooting the news stories herself. In 2007 she joined Fox CT (now referred to as Fox 61) in Hartford, Connecticut, once again as a reporter; by the time of her departure in 2012, she was also working as the weekend news anchor at the station. While in Hartford, Lahmers also wrote columns for local publications such as the Hartford Courant.

From 2012 until 2014 Lahmers was an on-air personality at Back9Network, a golf cable television start-up, along with her then-husband Jamie Bosworth, a former golf pro and co-founder of the station. In 2014 Lahmers moved to the Fox station in New York City, WNYW-TV, as a general assignments reporter. In 2017 she was promoted to daily co-anchor of the station's early morning news program, Good Day Wake Up, which airs before Good Day New York, along with long-time New York television news reporter Sukanya Krishnan. During that time she also hosted Studio 5, a series of entertainment news specials on WNYW.

In August 2019, Lahmers left WNYW to join the revamped entertainment news program Extra, now hosted by Billy Bush. Lahmers relocated to Los Angeles and began reporting for the show in September 2019.  As a correspondent, she conducts sit-down studio interviews, as well as covering high-profile film premieres and red carpet events. This included the 2020 Golden Globe Awards, at which she wore an elegant strapless green ball gown that shot her to fame as an exquisitely beautiful reporter.

In January 2023, Lahmers along with fellow Extra correspondent Melvin Robert joined Good Day L.A., in a likely move to return to local television scene, as well with their reporting for Extra.

Personal life

Lahmers has been an advocate for the prevention of domestic violence since 2009, when Alice Morrin, a close friend and colleague at Fox CT, was murdered by her husband. Lahmers was married to golf pro and cable network executive Jamie Bosworth from 2011 until 2014. On November 17, 2021, Lahmers gave birth to a son, Ethan, with boyfriend Dr. Jarod Keller.

Filmography

References

External links
 

1984 births
American women television journalists
Living people
New York (state) television reporters
Ohio University alumni
People from Dover, Ohio
Television anchors from New York City
Models from New York City
People from Tuscarawas County, Ohio
21st-century American women